were massive flags used in feudal Japan to identify a daimyō or equally important military commander on the field of battle. They came into prominence during the Sengoku period. While many were simply large flags, not very different from sashimono or hata-jirushi, most were three-dimensional figures, more like kites, and in the shape of bells, gongs, umbrellas, or streamers.

While these standards took many forms, they all fall into two broad categories: the ō-uma-jirushi and the ko-uma-jirushi, the great standard and the lesser standard respectively. Poorer daimyo had just one, the lesser standard, while wealthier daimyo had both. In 1645, the Tokugawa shogunate formalized this, allowing daimyo with an income above 1300 koku to have a ko-uma-jirushi, and daimyo earning more than 6000 koku to have an ō-uma-jirushi as well.

The ō-uma-jirushi was the nucleus of action on the battlefield, and while it aided the organization and morale of friendly troops, it also attracted the attention of enemy warriors. The carrier of the uma-jirushi, therefore, was arguably the most dangerous position to be in on the field. The ō-uma-jirushi was sometimes held in a leather bucket attached to the carrier's belt; the especially large ones would often be securely strapped into a carrying frame on the warrior's back. The carrier was provided with ropes to steady the standard in the wind, or while running.

In the mid 1600s, a monk called Kyūan completed a text called O Uma Jirushi, a comprehensive illustrated survey of the heraldry of his time. This text describes the heraldry of most, if not all, of the major samurai families of the battles of the Sengoku period. The text still survives today, and remains one of the chief sources of heraldic information available today on this period in Japan.

Photo gallery

References

Turnbull, Stephen (1998). The Samurai Sourcebook. London: Cassell & Co.
Turnbull, Stephen (2002). War in Japan: 1467–1615. Oxford: Osprey Publishing.

External links
 Guns Scrolls and Swords exhibit at the Harold B. Lee Library, includes full text PDFs of an anonymous Hata Uma–Jirushi Ezu

Military communication in feudal Japan
Flags of Japan
Japanese heraldry
Samurai weapons and equipment